Dominican Republic is competing at the 2013 World Aquatics Championships in Barcelona, Spain between 19 July and 4 August 2013.

Diving

Dominican Republic qualified two quota places for the following diving events.

Men

Swimming

Dominican Republic swimmers achieved qualifying standards in the following events (up to a maximum of 2 swimmers in each event at the A-standard entry time, and 1 at the B-standard):

Men

Women

References

External links
Barcelona 2013 Official Site
FEDONA web site 

Nations at the 2013 World Aquatics Championships
2013 in Dominican Republic sport
Dominican Republic at the World Aquatics Championships